William Womack Heath, (December 7, 1903 – June 22, 1971), was an American lawyer, educator, and diplomat.

Personal background
William W. Heath was born in Normangee, Texas, to John Al and Runie (née Hill) Heath. On July 14, 1929, William Womack Heath married Mavis Barnett (February 14, 1908 to April 9, 1998) and they will be a lifelong couple. After his death, Mavis will marry a 2nd time to David Harold Byrd on her birthday, February 14, 1974.

Career
As a young man, Heath attended the University of Texas law school. He was elected county attorney of Grimes County. After admission to the state bar in the fall of 1924, Heath served two terms as county attorney (1925–29) and then one term as county judge (1931–32). In 1933 he was appointed secretary of state by Governor Miriam A. Ferguson. He was assistant attorney general under Governor James V. Allred from 1935 to 1937. Heath retired to private practice as insurance lawyer in 1937. In 1950 he purchased Circle Bar Ranch in Blanco County near that of his long-time friend Lyndon B. Johnson.

Heath reentered public service in 1952, when Governor Price Daniel appointed him chairman of the Texas Board of State Hospitals and Special Schools. In 1959 he was named to the board of regents of the University of Texas, which he served as chairman from 1962 to 1966.

In August 1965, Heath proposed the establishment of the Lyndon B. Johnson Presidential Library in Austin, Texas.

Ambassador to Sweden

On March 22, 1967, Heath accepted Johnson's appointment as ambassador to Sweden. On March 8, 1968, however, he was recalled to the United States in a demonstration of American displeasure with Swedish education minister Olof Palme in an anti-Vietnam War protest that took place on February 21. The U.S. would not appoint a new ambassador to Sweden until 1970 when Jerome H. Holland was appointed.

References

Sources
William Womack Heath on Texas State Historical Association

Ambassadors of the United States to Sweden
1903 births
1971 deaths
University of Texas School of Law alumni